Relevance, in the common law of evidence, is the tendency of a given item of evidence to prove or disprove one of the legal elements of the case, or to have probative value to make one of the elements of the case likelier or not. Probative is a term used in law to signify "tending to prove". Probative evidence "seeks the truth". Generally in law, evidence that is not probative (doesn't tend to prove the proposition for which it is proffered) is inadmissible and the rules of evidence permit it to be excluded from a proceeding or stricken from the record "if objected to by opposing counsel".  A balancing test may come into the picture if the value of the evidence needs to be weighed versus its prejudicial nature.

Under the Federal Rules of Evidence (United States)
Until the Federal Rules of Evidence were restyled in 2011, Rule 401 defined relevance as follows:

This definition incorporates the requirement that evidence be both material ("of consequence to the determination of the action") and have probative value ("having any tendency to make the existence of any [material] fact...more probable or less probable than it would be without the evidence"). The restyled Rule 401, however, separates these traditional concepts in order to make the rule clearer and more easily understood. The amended language essentially rewrites the rule as a test, rather than a definition, for relevance:

Evidence and the matter properly provable
According to the notes of the Advisory Committee appointed to draft the Federal Rules of Evidence,

The United States Court of Appeals for the District of Columbia Circuit explains the concept of "matter properly provable" as follows:

Relevance and admissibility
Generally, relevant evidence is admissible.  However, relevant evidence is not admissible if prohibited by the Constitution, an Act of Congress, by the Federal Rules of Evidence, or by rules prescribed by the Supreme Court.  Under the Federal Rules of Evidence, relevant evidence may be excluded on the basis of enumerated grounds.

Relevance is required but may not be sufficient

Relevance is ordinarily a necessary condition, but not a sufficient condition, for the admissibility of evidence.  For example, relevant evidence may be excluded if its tendency to prove or disprove a fact is heavily outweighed by the possibility that the evidence will prejudice or confuse the jury.

Inadmissible versus excluded evidence
FRE 402 refers to relevant evidence as 'inadmissible' if 'otherwise provided by' several sources of law.  Yet, FRE 403 refers to 'exclusion of relevant evidence.  It is clear that evidence excluded under FRE 403 is inadmissible.  However, it is not clear that inadmissible evidence is considered 'excluded' within the meaning of the Federal Rules of Evidence.

Exclusion of relevant evidence

Under Rule 403 of the Federal Rules of Evidence, relevant evidence may be excluded if its probative value is substantially outweighed by the danger of one or more of the enumerated grounds for exclusion.  The grounds for exclusion are:
 unfair prejudice
 confusing the issues
 misleading the jury
 undue delay
 wasting time
 needlessly presenting cumulative evidence
In an exemplary hypothetical; if 100 witnesses saw the same accident, and would each give roughly the same description of the event, the testimony of each would be equally relevant, but it would be a waste of time or a needless presentation of cumulative evidence to have all 100 repeat the same facts at trial.

Preservation of the issue
To preserve legal error for review, objections must be raised. Often objections against the introduction of evidence are made on the basis of relevance.  However, the rules and opinions demonstrate that relevant evidence includes a significant portion of typically offered evidence.  Since objections are required to be specific and timely, merely objecting on the basis of relevance, without more, may prevent the review of legal error on appeal.United States v. Wilson, 966 F.2d 243 (7th Cir. 1992)  More particularly, making an objection based on “relevance” does not preserve an error based on Rule 403.  Cases that lack specific and timely objections are sometimes referred to as having "poor records" because errors made by the lower court may not be reviewed on appeal.

Public policy concerns

A variety of social policies operate to exclude relevant evidence. Thus, there are limitations on the use of evidence of liability insurance, subsequent remedial measures, settlement offers, and plea negotiations, mainly because it is thought that the use of such evidence discourages parties from carrying insurance, fixing hazardous conditions, offering to settle, and pleading guilty to crimes, respectively.

Canada
The Canadian judiciary system utilizes the term "probative", which also signifies "prove to be worthy".

History of legal doctrine
In 1970, the Supreme Court of Canada was concerned with exclusionary discretion within the judicial system. In R. v. Wray, the term "probative value" is used to explain that "judges in criminal cases do not have a discretion to exclude evidence because of how it was obtained."

The sole discretion to exclude evidence is based on the weighing of prejudicial value and probative value. Where the material evidence is being considered for exclusion:

Judges may face the need to weigh the probative value versus the prejudicial impact in nearly any case. A part of this is symbolized by a weighing scale and represents justice.

 Australia 
Australian rule of evidence is a mixture of statute and common law, together with the rules of court. It has a uniform Evidence Act (UEA or the "Act") that consists of Acts of the Commonwealth, New South Wales, Victoria, Tasmania, the Australian Capital Territory, and the Northern Territory. This therefore applies in most, but not all, states and territories of Australia. The rules of evidence work to ensure that criminal trials are conducted in a manner that is fair to both parties in the proceedings, with distinct focus on testing of evidence.

 Relevance and admissibility 
As per Barwick CJ in Wilson, "The fundamental rule governing the admissibility of evidence is that it be relevant. In every instance the proffered evidence must ultimately be brought to that touchstone."

The scheme of Chapter 3 of the Act deals with admissibility of evidence. Evidence which is relevant is generally admissible, and evidence which is irrelevant is inadmissible. Evidence is relevant if it is evidence which, if accepted, could rationally affect (directly or indirectly) the assessment of the probability of a fact in issue in the proceedings. Since evidence that is relevant has the capability to affect the assessment of the probability of the existence of a fact in issue, it is "probative". This determination is known as logical relevance. Logical relevance merely requires evidence have a logical connection to the facts in issue. But neither s 55 nor s 56 of the Act requires that evidence be probative to a particular degree for it to be admissible. Evidence that is of only some, even slight, probative value will be admissible, just as it is at common law. Therefore, evidence is either relevant or it is not and if the evidence is not relevant then no further question arises about its admissibility. However,  logical relevance isn't sufficient to establish the potential admissibility of the evidence and is still possible for the evidence to be inadmissible. This determination is known as "legal relevance" as opposed to logical relevance and sets a demanding test for discretionary exclusion (but one that is not obligatory) where its probative value is substantially outweighed by the danger that the evidence might be unfairly prejudicial. Once the legal relevance of the evidence is established, the exclusionary principles and exceptions to those principles are also to be considered.

Tendency and coincidence evidence
The definitions of these types of evidence and how they may be used differ slightly among some the. Under Victoria's Evidence Act 2008:Tendency evidence is evidence that allows the jury to reason that the accused had committed the crime before, has a propensity to do such a thing, and that it is likely that they did it again on the occasion in question.Coincidence evidence' is evidence using the unlikelihood of two or more events occurring coincidentally in order to prove that a person did a particular act.

Judges have to determine whether these types of evidence, based on how the parties are looking to use the evidence; this determines which admissibility test applies, and what directions to give to the jury.

John Stratton, NSW Deputy Senior Public Defender, opined at a 2008 legal conference that there was no clear dividing line between the two, although some cases had determined precedents for use. He thought that "the tendency and the coincidence principles should be regarded as alternative and overlapping avenues by which material may be introduced into evidence".

Relevance and reliability 
Reliability considers the probative force of the evidence (the legal relevance), rather than the evidence's ability to affect the probability of the existence of a fact in issue (the logical relevance).

See also
Evidence
Prejudice (legal procedure)

References

Evidence law
Common law legal terminology